Kirkby-in-Furness, generally referred to simply as Kirkby locally, is a village in the Furness area of Cumbria, England. Historically part of Lancashire, it's located close to the Lake District National Park. It is one of the largest villages on the peninsula's north-western coast, looking out over the Duddon estuary. In 2019 it had an estimated population of 563.

History
Kirkby is a collection of six different hamlets, namely: Soutergate, Wall End, Beck Side, Sand Side, Marshside and Chapels. The name Kirkby was used by the Furness Railway company during the construction of its Cumbrian Coast Line, and was the name they gave to the station which serves these hamlets. The name Kirkby is much older. The parish of Kirkby Ireleth, a name of Norse origin, is listed in the Domesday Book as one of the townships forming the Manor of Hougun which was held by Tostig Godwinson, Earl of Northumbria.

Much of the housing and infrastructure in Kirkby arose due to the growth and development of the Burlington Slate Quarries, which are owned by the Cavendish family of Holker Hall and Chatsworth House in Derbyshire. Houses at Marshside and Incline Foot were originally built for quarry workers, and the railway linked up to the quarries following bogie lines. Present-day Kirkby-in-Furness is now primarily a commuter village but still provides a work force for the slate and agrarian work.

The village has an increasingly aged population due to the rise in house prices and lack of homes suitable for first time buyers. This has led to young families leaving Kirkby, buying cheaper houses in surrounding towns and villages. As a result, the intake for the local primary school has fallen dramatically in the last few years, and continues to fall.

Amenities
The village has a primary school - Burlington Church of England Primary School - and most older children attend Victoria High School at Ulverston with a few attending Dowdales School in Dalton-in-Furness and John Ruskin School in Coniston.

There is a corner shop, a post office adjacent to the shop and a service station, all centrally located in Kirkby at Four Lane Ends and a cafe that is open three days a week - Sunday to Tuesday only - opposite the railway station. There is also a surgery on the road between Four Lane Ends and the railway station.

It has three places of worship: the parish church, St Cuthbert's in Beck Side; a methodist church in Marshside and a Church of Christ meeting house at Wall End.

The village has two pubs, The Commercial at Four Lane Ends and The Ship Inn, which dates from 1691, near the railway station.

There is a community centre in Beck Side - refurbished in 2019/20 - with changing rooms for the adjacent recreation ground which has a cricket pitch, a football pitch, a crown bowling green, two hard tennis courts and a children's playground. There is also the old village hall, the Beck Side Rooms, in the old, converted, school buildings.

Sport & leisure
The cricket club, football club, bowls club and tennis club are all based at the recreation ground in Beck Side.

The Kirkby in Furness Cricket Club play league fixtures on a Saturday in the Cumbria Cricket League Division 1 and also midweek fixtures on a Wednesday night in the Furness Cricket League. Kirkby United Football Club play in the Furness Premier League; Kirkby-in-Furness Bowls club play a number of competitive matches throughout the summer months and Kirkby Tennis Club compete in the Duddon Tennis League.

The village has a number of active societies, covering a range of interests. These include the History of Kirkby Group, that has a number of publications to its name, the Kirkby Floral and Horticultural Society and the Kirkby Photographic Club.

Transport
Kirkby is situated on the A595 giving direct access to Askam, Dalton-in-Furness and Barrow-in-Furness to the south and villages and towns on the Cumbria Coast to Whitehaven and beyond.

There is a limited bus service for Kirkby, the Blueworks X7 service, running on Wednesdays and Fridays only with the morning bus originating at Coniston and the afternoon bus returning to the same location. This allows a brief return journey to Askam, Dalton and Barrow, the return service leaving Barrow a little over two and a half hours after the inbound service arrives.

 station is a request stop on the Cumbrian Coast Line, with the rail service being provided by Northern.

Notable people

 George 'Barnet' Burns (1805 – 26 December 1860), sailor, trader and showman who spent time in New Zealand living as a Pākehā Māori.
 Henry 'Harry' Gifford (1884 - 1952), professional rugby league footballer who played for Barrow, Lancashire, England and Great Britain.

See also
Listed buildings in Kirkby Ireleth
Kirkby Moor
Duddon Estuary

References

External links
 Kirkby-in-Furness village web site

Villages in Cumbria
Furness
Populated coastal places in Cumbria
South Lakeland District